The 1929 All-Big Six Conference football team consists of American football players chosen by various organizations for All-Big Six Conference teams for the 1929 college football season.  The selectors for the 1929 season included the Associated Press (AP).

All-Big Six selections

Ends
 H. Keith Hursley, Missouri (AP-1)
 Tom Churchill, Oklahoma (AP-1)
 Steve Hokuf, Nebraska (AP-2)
 William G. Towler, Kansas State (AP-2)

Tackles
 Ray Richards, Nebraska (AP-1)
 Cookie Tackwell, Kansas State (AP-1)
 Jack Schopflin, Kansas (AP-2)
 Marion Broadstone, Nebraska (AP-2)

Guards
 George Atkeson, Kansas (AP-1)
 K. C. Bauman, Kansas State (AP-1)
 George Koster, Nebraska (AP-2)
 Weldon C. Gentry, Oklahoma (AP-2)

Centers
 Raymond Smith, Missouri (AP-1)
 Frank Bausch, Kansas (AP-2)

Quarterbacks
 John Waldorf, Missouri (AP-1)
 Alex Nigro, Kansas State (AP-2)

Halfbacks
 James Bausch, Kansas (AP-1)
 Frank Crider, Oklahoma (AP-1)
 George Farley, Nebraska, (AP-2)
 George Wiggins, Kansas State (AP-2)

Fullbacks
 Clair Sloan, Nebraska (AP-1)
 Earl Fox, Kansas (AP-2)

Key
AP = Associated Press

See also
 1929 College Football All-America Team

References

All-Big Six Conference football team
All-Big Eight Conference football teams